Bahauddin Zakaria Express (Seraiki) is a passenger train operated daily by SSR Group between Karachi and Multan. The train named after Abu Muhammad Bahauddin Zakariya, a famous Sufi saint of the Suhrawardiyya order who lived in Multan between 1171 and 1262. Bahauddin Zakaria Express Train is privatised recently in April 2022 on Public-Private Partnership to Apni Rail (SSR Group).

Route 
 Karachi City–Multan Cantonment via Karachi–Peshawar Railway Line

Station stops

Equipment 
Bahauddin Zakaria Express offers AC Business, AC Standard and Economy seating accommodations.

Incidents
1990 Sukkur rail disaster: On 4 January 1990, the Bahaudddin Zakaria Express was on a  overnight run from Multan to Karachi. Near Sangi village outside of Sukkur, Sindh the tracks were incorrectly set and sent the train hurdling into a siding where it collided with an empty 67-car freight train at a speed of at least 55 mph, killing 307 people. It remains one of the worst rail disasters in Pakistan Railways history.
2016 Landhi rail accident: 22 people were killed and more than 65 injured when the Bahauddin Zakaria Express collided with the Fareed Express at Juma Goth Train station situated in Landhi, Karachi on the morning of 3 November 2016.

References 

Named passenger trains of Pakistan
Passenger trains in Pakistan